Idols South Africa VI is the sixth season of South African reality interactive talent show based on the British talent show Pop Idol. It premiered on 18 July 2010.
For the first time Dave Thompson was not a member of the judging panel. The remaining three judges all returned and were supported by a guest judge in every casting city: Zolani (member of FreshlyGround) in Cape Town, Kahn Morebee (The Parlotones) in Johannesburg, Steve Hofmeyr in Durban, HHP in Port Elizabeth, and Loyiso in Bloemfontein.

The fourteen semifinalists where split in two groups of seven and performed live at Mosaïek Teatro on 22 and 27 August 2010 respectively. After the bottom two from each vote were eliminated, the remaining finalists were merged for the round of the top ten.

Top ten contestant Jamie-Lee Sexton had already been a finalist on Idols III under the name Jamie-Lee Blokdyk where she placed twelfth. She is therefore the first Idol contestant worldwide that made the finals on two different seasons.  Accordingly, this was the second season (after season five) in which the top two contestants were never in the bottom, and (after the first season) the second in which both finalists were male.

Top 14

Group 1
Guest Judge: Ross Learmonth

Group 2
Guest Judge: Judith Sephuma

Finals

Finalists
(ages stated at time of contest)

Top 10 – Rock / Pop

Guest Judge: Kahn Morbee

Top 9 – Disco

Guest Judge: Tamara Dey

Top 8 – Home Brew

Guest Judge: Tumi Masemola

Top 7 – Tribute To Michael Jackson

Guest Judge: Loyiso Bala

Top 6.1 - DJ's Choice
Guest Judge: Bongani Nchanga

Top 6.2 - Showstoppers
Guest Judge: Kurt Darren

Top 4 - Unplugged
Guest Judge: Louise Carver

Top 3 - Choices
Guest Judge: Hip Hop Pantsula

Top 2 - Finale

Elimination Chart

References

External links
 Idols website

Season 06
2010 South African television seasons